David P. Lewis (born David Peter Lewis; May 18, 1820 – July 3, 1884) was a lawyer and politician who served as the 23rd governor of Alabama from 1872 to 1874 during the Reconstruction era. He was also a Deputy from Alabama to the Provisional Congress of the Confederate States, serving from February until April 1861, when he resigned from office. He was a Unionist. He was the last Republican to serve as Governor of Alabama until H. Guy Hunt was elected in 1986.

Biography
In 1861, David P. Lewis was a Deputy to the Provisional Congress of the Confederate States, representing Alabama. He was a delegate to the 1868 Democratic National Convention. In 1869, he joined the Republican Party. As a well-known North Alabama Unionist who nevertheless supported the Confederate States of America, he was an attractive candidate for governor. He won decisively over Democrat Thomas Herndon. The 1872 election was highly controversial, and conflicting election returns resulted in the seating of two different legislatures controlled by each party. During his term, unsuccessful attempts were made to pass civil rights legislation that would have barred discrimination by common carriers, hotels, schools, and theaters. The impact of the Panic of 1873, as well as the civil rights controversies, led to Lewis' defeat in 1874. Lewis later unsuccessfully sought an appointment to the federal bench. Disillusioned by politics, he returned to the practice of law in Huntsville, where he is interred at Maple Hill Cemetery. He never married and died at age 64 in Huntsville, Alabama.

See also
 List of governors of Alabama

References

External links

 
 David P. Lewis at National Governors Association
 David P. Lewis at The Political Graveyard

1820 births
1884 deaths
19th-century American politicians
Alabama lawyers
Alabama Secession Delegates of 1861
Alabama Unionists
Burials in Alabama
Deputies and delegates to the Provisional Congress of the Confederate States
People of Alabama in the American Civil War
Republican Party governors of Alabama
Signers of the Confederate States Constitution
Signers of the Provisional Constitution of the Confederate States
19th-century American lawyers